The Orlando Quartet was a classical music string quartet based in Amsterdam, formed in 1976 and active until 1997.

Members
First violin: 
 Istvan Parkanyi, of Hungary, (born in Leipzig, Germany), (1976–1984)
 John Harding, born in Australia, (1985–1990)
 Arvid Engegård, of Norway, (1991–1997)

Second violin: 
 Heinz Oberdorfer, of Germany

Viola:
 Ferdinand Erblich, of Austria

Cello:
 Stefan Metz, of Romania

Successor
In 1998, Istvan Parkanyi, Heinz Oberdorfer, Ferdinand Erblich and cellist Michael Müller formed the Parkanyi Quartet.

Discography
The Orlando Quartet released albums of works by Mozart, Haydn, Schubert, Debussy, Dvořák, Mendelssohn Bartholdy and Ravel.

References

Musical groups established in 1976
Musical groups from Amsterdam
String quartets